SS Cars was a British manufacturer of sports saloon cars from 1934 until wartime 1940, and from March 1935 of a limited number of open 2-seater sports cars.  From September 1935 their new models displayed a new name SS Jaguar.

By then its business, founded in 1922, was run by and largely owned by William Lyons. Lyons had been partner with 1922 co-founder William Walmsley until Walmsley sold his shareholding in January 1935.

The company that owned the business, S. S. Cars Limited, bought the shares of Swallow Coachbuilding Limited as of 31 July 1934 and the Swallow company was liquidated before S. S. issued shares to the public in January 1935. This was the time when Walmsley finished selling his holding.

S. S. Cars Limited changed its name to Jaguar Cars Limited 23 March 1945.

S. S.

There is doubt about the source of the SS name. Sir John Black of Standard-Triumph when asked said SS stood for Standard Swallow. William Lyons when asked was noncommittal, but he was at the time in the company of suppliers of chassis for his run of the mill production bodies. He concurred after the use of Standard chassis became exclusive.

The Swallow Sidecar Company, trading name for the company Walmsley & Lyons co-founded by William Lyons and William Walmsley, progressively developed into a coachbuilder from its 1922 start, first making stylish sidecars for motorcycles. In May 1927, Swallow advertised that it would make 2-seater bodies on Austin and Morris chassis and running gear supplied through any authorised dealer. Their first full page advertisement appeared in the Autocar magazine in October 1927 to fit with the Olympia Motor Show. The next year Swallow relocated to the heart of the British motor industry. In the winter of 1928-1929 they moved bit by bit from Cocker Street Blackpool to a disused munitions factory on a rutted track, the future Swallow Road, off Holbrook Lane, Foleshill, Coventry. They returned to Blackpool each year for the Works Day Out.

In 1929 John Black of Standard Motor Company and William Lyons teamed up to realise their long standing dream to produce a one of a kind sports car. This "First SS" was a sleek boat-tail open 2-seater. Its flowing design and streamlining pointed to an obvious attempt at making a fast car, possibly with the intention of venturing into racing. This car is believed to have been shipped to Australia in the late 1940s.

While the initial link with John Black's Standard was slowly developed, bodies continued to be built on Austin, Standard, Fiat and lastly Wolseley Hornet chassis. Nevertheless, at Motor Show time in October 1931, Swallow eventually launched a car of its own, the SS 1, and displayed a prototype, all while the aforementioned little Wolseley Hornet Special continued alongside.

"This car has its little knot of admirers around it every minute of the day, and from the point of view of general interest it is the most serious rival to the Rover Scarab. It is made by the Swallow Coachbuilding people on a chassis specially built for them by Standard, and featuring a six-cylinder side-valve engine of 15hp.
But it is the body that is the big attraction. Its long low lines with no running boards and the head only a matter of four feet above the ground create an impression of speed and gracefulness which is quite worthy of comparison with the Lagondas and Delages. It is with a distinct shock that one notices the price is only £310.
The radiator is quite different from the ordinary Standard type being specially designed to conform with the body lines and fitted with a chromium plated fluted front. It is set off with a futuristic emblem and the filler cap is tucked out of sight under the bonnet.
The Rudge-Whitworth wire wheels are racing type, the wheel base being 9 ft 4 in and the track 4 ft 1 in
The coachbuilt body has a sliding roof of new design with leather-grained head and large travelling trunk at the rear. The cycle type wings are deeply domed the side valances being very deep so that the necessity for running boards is obviated
The interior of the car is beautifully finished, the cabinet work being done in very atrractive highly polished sycamore grained to resemble the back of a fiddle. The upholstery is in furniture hide
The particular model shown is finished in apple green and black and is a beauty in every sense of the term."

SS 1 and SS 2

Under the guidance of the chairman, William Lyons, the company survived the depression years of the 1930s by making a series of beautifully styled cars offering exceptional value for money although some enthusiasts criticised them at the time for being "more show than go". The engines and chassis supplied by the Standard Motor Company were fitted with Swallow bodies styled under Lyons supervision.

The first of the SS range of cars available to the public was the 1932 SS 1 with 2-litre or 2½-litre side-valve, six-cylinder engine and the SS 2 with a four-cylinder 1-litre side-valve engine.  Initially available as coupé or tourer a saloon was added in 1934, when the chassis was modified to be 2 inches (50 mm) wider.

SS 90

The first of the open two-seater sports cars came in March 1935 with the SS 90, so called because of its claimed  top speed. This car used the 2½-litre side-valve, six-cylinder engine in a short-chassis "cut and shut" SS 1 brought down to an SS 2's wheelbase, only 23 were made.

Harry Weslake was set to work on engine development. Bill Heynes came to be chief engineer from Hillman — before that Humber. Weslake's new cylinder head was manufactured for SS by Standard.

The Weslake head and twin RAG carburetters were fitted to the last year's production of SS 1 and SS 2 cars.

Famous name

Four-door sports saloons and drophead coupés

To counteract the  "more show than go" criticism of their SS90, Lyons had engaged William Heynes as chief engineer and Harry Weslake for engine tuning. Weslake was asked to redesign the 2½-litre 70 bhp side-valve engine to achieve 90 bhp. His answer was an overhead-valve design that produced 102 bhp and it was this engine that launched the new SS Jaguar sports and saloon cars in 1936.

The SS Jaguar 2½-litre saloon with its 102 bhp six-cylinder Weslake-designed cross-flow ohv cylinder head on its Standard engine caused a sensation when it was launched at a trade luncheon for dealers and press at London's Mayfair Hotel on 21 September 1935. The show car was in fact a prototype. Luncheon guests were asked to write down the UK price for which they thought the car would be sold and the average of their answers was £765.  Even in that deflationary period, the actual price at just £395 would have been a pleasant surprise for many customers. Also available was a similar looking but scaled-down version using a 1½-litre four-cylinder side-valve engine.

The Motor magazine in its announcement issue of 24 September 1935 referred to the SS Jaguar's distinguished appearance, outstanding performance and attractive price. With its new 2½-litre engine it could now compete with Cecil Kimber's heavily influenced by Morris but brand new MG SA.

Extract from the speech of chairman and managing director Mr W  Lyons to the shareholders Friday 11 October 1935"This new car, which is called the Jaguar and has received a most enthusiastic reception from the whole of the trade and public has been produced to an ideal. It has fulfilled all our most optimistic anticipations, for it was intended to produce a car of extremely high quality and performance, hitherto associated with only the most exclusive type of car, at a moderate price."

Everyone else noted the new grille's likeness to a Bentley's.

Steel
In 1938 saloon and drophead production moved from coachbuilt (wood framed) to all steel and a 3½-litre engine was added to the range. The 2½-litre and 3½-litre cars shared the same chassis and body design although it was necessary to use a wider radiator for the 3½-litre. The new 1½-litre for 1938 used the same body shell as the six-cylinder cars but on a shorter chassis and its new larger 1776 cc engine had overhead valves.

SS 100

The new open two-seater sports car carried the title: SS Jaguar 100.  Only 198 of the 2½-litre and 116 of the 3½-litre models were made and with a  top speed and 0-60 mph time of 11 seconds the survivors are highly sought after, rarely coming on the market.

Models

 1932–36 SS 1 6-cylinder; Sixteen 2054 cc or Twenty 2552 cc

 1932–36 SS 2 4-cylinder; 1006 cc; then from 1934 either 1343 cc or 1608 cc

From October 1935 SS Jaguar

Open cars:
 1935-37 SS Jaguar 90 6-cylinder; Twenty 2663 cc

 1936–40 SS Jaguar 100 6-cylinder; 2663 cc or 3485 cc

Four-door sports saloons and two-door drophead coupés

 1935–40 SS Jaguar 1½-litre 4-cylinder
 1935–40 SS Jaguar 2½-litre 6-cylinder
 1938–40 SS Jaguar 3½-litre 6-cylinder
 for information only — postwar and not SS
 1946–49 Jaguar 1½-litre 4-cylinder
 1946–48 Jaguar 2½-litre 6-cylinder
 1946–48 Jaguar 3½-litre 6-cylinder

Car production stopped in 1940.

Jaguar Cars
On 23 March 1945 the shareholders in general meeting agreed to change the company's name to Jaguar Cars Limited. Said Chairman William Lyons "Unlike S.S. the name Jaguar  is distinctive and cannot be connected or confused with any similar foreign name."

When production restarted the saloons were simply named Jaguar 1½-litre, 2½-litre or 3½-litre. 
The model that followed these cars was called the Jaguar Mark V and so the immediate post war trio have become known unofficially as the Mark IV Jaguars.

S.S. Cars Limited, company number 00333482 which is current — but dormant — in 2014, was incorporated 9 November 1937 with the name Jaguar Cars Limited. Most likely this is a result of steps taken to protect famous names.

Swallow Coachbuilding Co. (1935) Limited 
This company, a wholly owned subsidiary of S. S., was formed for the production of Swallow sidecars and began operating on 1 May 1935. In January 1946 the Helliwell Group, an aircraft maintenance firm, bought Swallow Coachbuilding Company (1935) Limited from Jaguar Cars Limited. Sidecars produced at Helliwells' Walsall Airport works were built in the same way as the originals and used the same patented trademark. They closed their workshop in the late 1950s.

See also
 List of car manufacturers of the United Kingdom

Notes

References

External links

 Brochures for S.S. and Jaguar products
 Finch Motor Company SS100 Replica
 Jaguar Heritage website (official) 
 Steadman Jaguar TS100 Enthusiasts Club
 Suffolk Sportscars SS100 Replica

Coventry motor companies
Jaguar Cars
1930s cars
Vehicle manufacturing companies established in 1934
1934 establishments in England
Sports car manufacturers
Luxury motor vehicle manufacturers